Monaco first appeared in the quadrennial Mediterranean Games event in  in Barcelona. After missing two editions in 1967 and 1971, the country has consistently appeared at every event since 1975. As of 2018, Monegasque athletes have won a total of four medals.

Overview
Monaco's first medal came in 1963 in Naples, a bronze won by sailors Gérard Battaglia and Jean-Pierre Crovetto in the Snipe category. Along with Jules Soccal, they had competed three years earlier in the Dragon event as part of the 1960 Rome Olympics which also took place in the Gulf of Naples, where they finished 23rd. 

This was the first major sporting medal won by any Monegasque competitor since architect Julien Médécin had been awarded a bronze medal in art competition at the 1924 Olympics in Paris.

Monaco's second medal came 46 years later, in the 2009 Mediterranean Games at Pescara, with judoka Yann Siccardi winning silver in the 60 kg event. In 2018 in Tarragona Lucas Catarina won silver in the men's tennis tournament, and the Chinese-born table tennis player Xiaoxin Yang added another silver in the women's singles tournament.

At the 2022 Mediterranean Games Xiaoxin Yang won a gold medal in women's singles, making it the first gold for Monaco in any international sporting event in history.

By event

By sport

See also
Monaco at the Olympics
Monaco at the Paralympics

References

External links
Medals table per country and per Games at the official International Committee of Mediterranean Games (CIJM) website